Saint Johns is an unincorporated community in McCracken County, Kentucky, United States.

Notable people
Ray Sanders, singer, was born in Saint Johns.

Notes

Unincorporated communities in McCracken County, Kentucky
Unincorporated communities in Kentucky